Atchley is a surname. Notable people with the surname include:

Ben Atchley (1930–2018), American politician
E. G. Cuthbert F. Atchley, English liturgical scholar
Hooper Atchley (1887–1943), American actor
Justin Atchley (born 1973), American baseball player
Kenneth Atchley (born 1954), American composer